Abram Robertson Byram (died 1893) was an Australian cabinetmaker and politician. He served as alderman and mayor of Brisbane Municipal Council, Queensland, Australia.

Personal life
Abram Robertson Byram was born about 1825, the son of James Cooper Byram and Mary Robertson. He married Elizabeth Freeman Elliot in Tynemouth, England in 1848. They had the following children in England:
 Maria Freeman Byram, born about 1850 Tynemouth, England, married 1872 in Rockhampton, Queensland to Willam James
Hartley
 William Elliot Byram, born 1851 in Tynemouth, England

Abram and his family immigrated to Sydney on the Parsee, arriving on 17 Jan 1853; William died on the voyage.

Daughter Elizabeth Byram was born in 1854 in New South Wales. She married Norman Meredith Davis in Brisbane in 1882 and died in Brisbane in 1920.

They had more children in Brisbane:

 William James Byram, born 1861. He died in 1922 in Queensland
 George Elliot Byram, born 1865. He died in 1875 in Queensland.

Abram Robertson Byram died at his home in Boundary Street, Spring Hill, Brisbane on 20 February 1893 aged 67. He is buried in Toowong Cemetery with his wife Elizabeth Freeman Byram and his sons George and William.

Public life
Abram Robertson Byram served as alderman of the Brisbane Municipal Council from 1877 to 1888 and as mayor in 1883. He served on  various committees:
 Improvement Committee 1879, 1881
 Legislative Committee 1879 - 1881, 1883
 Finance Committee 1878, 1880, 1882, 1887
 Works Committee 1883, 1888
 Health Committee 1888
 Town Hall Committee 1885, 1886.

See also
 List of mayors and lord mayors of Brisbane
 Photo of Abram Robertson Byram, 1883

Notes

External links

Mayors and Lord Mayors of Brisbane
1825 births
1893 deaths
Burials at Toowong Cemetery
Australian cabinetmakers
19th-century Australian politicians